Major adverse cardiovascular events (MACE, or major adverse cardiac events)  is a composite endpoint frequently used in cardiovascular research. Despite widespread use of the term in clinical trials, the definitions of MACE can differ, which makes comparison of similar studies difficult.

The so-called "classical 3-point MACE" is defined as a composite of nonfatal stroke, nonfatal myocardial infarction, and cardiovascular death. But another study defines MACE as "CVD events, admission for HF (Heart Failure), ischemic cardiovascular [CV] events, cardiac death, or MACE". Yet another study defined MACE as "CV death, hospitalization for HF, or myocardial infarction (MI)".

Two reviews have concluded that SGLT2 inhibitors benefit patients with atherosclerotic MACE. One of those studies defined MACE as the composite of myocardial infarction, stroke, or cardiovascular death.

The heterogeneity of the sets defining MACE, hampering systematic reviews and meta-analyses, has been repeatedly criticized.

References

Cardiovascular system